Burning Bridges is Haste the Day's debut full-length album. It was released on March 9, 2004, through Solid State Records. Music videos were released for "The Closest Thing to Closure" and "American Love".

Track listing

Credits 
Haste the Day
Jimmy Ryan – lead vocals
Brennan Chaulk – rhythm guitar, vocals
Jason Barnes – lead guitar
Michael Murphy – bass guitar, vocals
Devin Chaulk – drums, vocals

Additional musicians
 Lance Garvin – backing vocals
 Arthur Green – backing vocals

Production
 Roy Culver – executive producer
 Troy Glessner – mastering
 Barry Poynter – engineer, mixing, producer
 Zaine Tarpo – A&R

References

Haste the Day albums
2004 albums
Solid State Records albums